The 1990 Great American Bash was the second annual Great American Bash professional wrestling pay-per-view (PPV) event produced by World Championship Wrestling (WCW) under the National Wrestling Alliance (NWA) banner, and the sixth annual Great American Bash event overall. It was the final held under the NWA banner, as WCW seceded from the NWA in January 1991. The event took place on July 7, 1990, at the Baltimore Arena in Baltimore, Maryland. This was the third Great American Bash held at this venue after the 1988 and 1989 events. The 1990 event featured the WCW debut of Big Van Vader.

In the main event, Ric Flair defended the NWA World Heavyweight Championship against Sting. Sting pinned Flair after countering his Figure Four Leglock attempt into a small package. During the match, The Steiner Brothers, Paul Orndorff, and The Junkyard Dog (the "Dudes with Attitudes") surrounded the ring to prevent outside interference by The Four Horsemen. During the entirety of the match, Ole Anderson was handcuffed to El Gigante.

Production

Background
The Great American Bash is a professional wrestling event established in 1985. It was first produced by the National Wrestling Alliance's (NWA) Jim Crockett Promotions (JCP) and aired on closed-circuit television before becoming a pay-per-view event in 1988; JCP was rebranded as World Championship Wrestling (WCW) later that same year. The 1990 event was the second annual Great American Bash event promoted by WCW and sixth annual overall. The event took place on July 7, 1990, at the Baltimore Arena in Baltimore, Maryland. This was the third Great American Bash held at this venue after the 1988 and 1989 events.

Storylines

The event featured wrestlers from pre-existing scripted feuds and storylines. Wrestlers portrayed villains, heroes, or less distinguishable characters in the scripted events that built tension and culminated in a wrestling match or series of matches.

Aftermath
The 1990 Great American Bash would be the final Great American Bash held under the NWA banner, as WCW seceded from the NWA in January 1991.  

This would be Mark Callous' final appearance on a WCW PPV, after allegedly being told by booker Ole Anderson he would not draw well. Callous would head to the WWF where he would become the legendary Undertaker. 

Harley Race would retire from active wrestling after this match and become a manager of Lex Luger, and later Vader.  

Sting would hold the NWA World Heavyweight title through the remainder of 1990, shortly after the GAB a mysterious wrestler allegedly from Sting's past would begin haunting him under the name "The Black Scorpion".

Results

See also
1990 in professional wrestling

References

  Some of the prose in this article was copied from The Great American Bash 1990 at the Pro Wrestling Wiki, which is licensed under the Creative Commons Attribution-Share Alike 3.0 (Unported) (CC-BY-SA) license.

1990
1990 in Maryland
Events in Baltimore
Professional wrestling in Baltimore
July 1990 events in the United States
1990 World Championship Wrestling pay-per-view events